Hot sauce is a spicy sauce.

Hot sauce may also refer to:

Music
Hot Sauce (Jessy J album), released in 2011
Hot Sauce (NCT Dream album), released in 2021
"Hot Sauce" (song)
"Hot Sauce", a song by Thomas Dolby from his album Aliens Ate My Buick (1988)
"Hot Sauce", a song by Torren Foot (2018)

People
Major League Baseball pitcher Kevin Saucier (born 1956), also known as "Hot Sauce"
Mixed martial artist Trevor Smith (fighter) (born 1981), also known as "Hot Sauce"
Streetball player Philip Champion (born 1976), also known as "Hot Sauce"

Other uses
HotSauce in computer software

See also
 Hotsaucing, punishment by hot sauce
 Chili sauce, a condiment prepared with chili peppers or red tomato as a primary ingredient